Giancarlo Tognoni (22 June 1932 - 13 December 2020).Giancarlo Tognoni was an Italian painter, engraver and sculptor.  He was born in Pisa, but continued his studies in Florence, where he attended the art institute of the Tuscan capital. As soon as he graduated, he began his activity as a sculptor and ceramist, then coming to learn the various engraving techniques such as drypoint and etching, which will lead him to be considered one of the most important artists of Italian and foreign engravering art. Towards the end of the 1950s, he lived for some time in Paris, where he met Alberto Magnelli and Gino Severini and where, in particular, he could admire artists such as Jean Fautrier and Hartung. It is in this period, which will mark a transitory but significant season, that Tognoni approaches sign and material painting. At the beginning of the 1960s, he moved to Milan, where he began to attend the artistic circles of the city, spending most of his days at the "Spirale", the famous art printing house.  It is here that Tognoni meets Giuseppe Ajmone and Franco Russoli, with whom he will benefit form a strong friendship. The one with Franco Russoli, director of the Brera Art Gallery, will be a very important partnership, as will put Tognoni in contact with the main artists of the moment, such as Piero Manzoni and Lucio Fontana  and will encourage him to participate in many of the most important national and international exhibitions and reviews.  This is how the first significant successes and recognitions arrive, testimonies that will accompany him later, in his intense activity, both as a painter and as an engraver, but despite which, Tognoni will remain a secluded artist, out of the big spotlights, gathered in his own creativity, as well as study and experimentation. Many of the major Italian and international critics have written about him (Russoli, Ragghianti, Birke, Oberhuber, Santini, Monti, Venturi, Harprath, Freedberg, Bolelli, Nocentini, Perocco, Marchiori, Monteverdi, Miceli, Mugnoz, Carlesi, Gatto, Damiani, De Rosa, Federici, Settembrini, De Martino, Triglia, Paloscia, Luperini, and many others). His works are found in public and private collections: Florence, Gabinetto disegni e stampe degli Uffizi; Vienna, Accademia Albertina; Paris, special collections of the Bibliothèque nationale de France; Pisa, Department of History of Arts, University of Pisa "Collezione Timpano"; Barcelona, Fundació Joan Miró; Milan, Musei del Castello Sforzesco, collection "A. Bertelli"; Venice, International Gallery of Modern Art Ca'Pesaro; Washington, D.C., National Gallery of Art; Pisa, Scuola Normale Superiore di Pisa Puteano palace; Lucca, National Museum of Villa Guinigi; Batavia, Illinois, Fermilab; Turin,Fondazione per la Scuola "Educatorio Duchessa Isabella della Compagnia di San Paolo"; Monaco, Staatliche Graphische Sammlung München; Oderzo, Foundation Alberto Martini; Bagnacavallo, Graphics National Center; Carrara Accademia di Belle Arti; Trieste, Revoltella Museum.

Bibliography

External Links 
 
 
 
 
 
 
 
 
 
 Scuola Normale Superiore di Pisa (SNS)

Italian engravers
1932 births
2020 deaths
People from Pisa